Ikechukwu Prince Amadi (born November 26, 1979) is a Nigerian voice actor. He is known for voicing Javik in Mass Effect 3, Spartan Jameson Locke in Halo 5: Guardians, and the DC Comics villain Atrocitus in Injustice 2. He is also a founding father of MOPAC.

Filmography

Film

Television

Video games

References

External links

Living people
African-American male actors
American male video game actors
American male voice actors
American people of Nigerian descent
Nigerian male voice actors
University of Missouri alumni
University of Missouri–Kansas City alumni
21st-century American male actors
1979 births
21st-century African-American people
20th-century African-American people